Ion Comșa Stadium is a multi-use stadium in Călărași. It is the home ground of Dunărea Călărași. It holds 10,400 people.

External links
 Stadionul Ion Comșa on Soccerway

Football venues in Romania
Călărași
Buildings and structures in Călărași County